Štefanovce is a village and municipality in Prešov District in the Prešov Region of eastern Slovakia.

References 

Villages and municipalities in Prešov District
Šariš